Walker Island or Walker's Island can refer to:

In Tasmania:
Walker Island (Southern Tasmania), near Maatsuyker Island
Walker Island (Northern Tasmania), near Robbins Island

In the United States:
Conch Key, Florida is also known as Walker's Island